Herbert Ernest Lounds (30 May 1889–1964) was an English footballer who played in the Football League for Gainsborough Trinity, Halifax Town, Leeds City and Rotherham County.

References

1889 births
1964 deaths
English footballers
Association football forwards
English Football League players
Silverwood Colliery F.C. players
Gainsborough Trinity F.C. players
Leeds City F.C. players
Rotherham County F.C. players
Halifax Town A.F.C. players